Antonio Simmons Dini (7 January 1918 – 31 May 1940) was a New Zealand fighter pilot and flying ace who flew in the Royal Air Force (RAF) during the Second World War. Born in Christchurch, he joined the RAF in 1938 and in May 1940 was posted to No. 607 Squadron. Flying a Hawker Hurricane, he was credited with destroying five enemy aircraft during the Battle of France. He was killed when his aircraft crashed near Folkestone shortly after takeoff.

Early life
Born on 7 January 1918 in Christchurch, Antonio Simmons Dini was one of seven children of Pietro Antonio Dini and Minnie . Of Corsican descent, he was educated at Christchurch Technical College after which he found employment at the Post & Telegraph Department.

Royal Air Force
Dini made a successful application to join the Royal Air Force (RAF) on a short service commission, leaving for England in December 1937. Dini started flight training early the following year at the de Havilland flying school at Hatfield aerodrome, proceeded to Uxbridge, and then onto No. 3 Flying Training School at South Cerney.

After gaining his wings, Dini was loaned to the Fleet Air Arm, flying Supermarine Walrus amphibious aircraft. His rank of pilot officer was confirmed on 17 January 1939. He was subsequently assigned to the RAF's School of Naval Co-operation operating from RAF Ford in Sussex. Later in the year he was involved in a fatal incident when, as the pilot of a Walrus, he crashed the aircraft into the sea off Littlehampton. He was the only survivor of the three-man crew and had no recollection of the crash, with its cause being unable to be determined.

Second World War
By the time of Dini's return to active duty after recovering from the injuries arising from his crash, the Second World War had broken out. He was posted to No. 66 Squadron, which flew Supermarine Spitfire fighters from Duxford. From here it was occasionally scrambled to intercept incoming German aircraft and also carried out patrols over the North Sea. On 1 May 1940, Dini was posted to No. 607 Squadron, which had been sent to France the previous November as part of the Air Component of the British Expeditionary Force. At the time, the squadron, equipped with Hawker Hurricane fighters, was based at Vitry-en-Artois, near Arras.

Battle of France

No. 607 Squadron saw little activity for much of its time in France. However, once the Battle of France commenced on 10 May, Dini was promptly in action. At around 4:15 am, he and two other pilots from his squadron engaged Heinkel He 111 medium bombers that were attacking the airfield at Vitry. He damaged one of the bombers. He made three more sorties that day; in the afternoon, he shared in the destruction of a He 111, had sole credit for another shot down He 111 and on his last flight of the day, damaged yet another He 111.

Dini helped shoot down another He 111 on 11 May and then two days later destroyed a Messerschmitt Bf 109 fighter northeast of Brussels. On 17 May, Vitry was raided again and Dini's Hurricane was damaged during the attack, forcing his return to the airfield. Despite this, later in the day he destroyed a Dornier Do 17 bomber east of Cambrai, although this could not be conclusively confirmed, and then shot down two He 111s near Binche, in Belgium. He may have shot down another two Do 17s the following day.

By 20 May, No. 607 Squadron had been withdrawn to England and it began reassembling at Croydon. However, on his return to England, Dini was posted to No. 605 Squadron, based at Hawkinge at the time but about to move to Scotland, where it was to operate from Drem. On 31 May he was killed when he crashed near Folkestone soon after taking off in his Hurricane for the flight to Scotland. He had experienced an engine failure and his aircraft rolled into a dive. He is buried at Hawkinge Cemetery in Kent.

According to aviation historians Christopher Shores and Clive Williams, Dini is credited with destroying five enemy aircraft, and shared in the destruction of two more, two damaged, and three inconclusive.

Notes

References

1918 births
1940 deaths
New Zealand World War II flying aces
New Zealand World War II pilots
People from Christchurch
Royal Air Force pilots of World War II
Royal Air Force personnel killed in World War II
New Zealand people of French descent